I Wish My Brother George Was Here is the debut solo studio album by American hip hop musician Del the Funky Homosapien. It was released by Elektra Records in 1991. It peaked at number 24 on the Billboard Heatseekers Albums chart, as well as number 48 on the Top R&B/Hip-Hop Albums chart.

It has been incorrectly assumed that the title of the album is a reference to George Clinton. The title actually refers to a quote from a Looney Tunes short film, which is in turn a reference to Liberace's catchphrase, which he would say on his television show whenever his brother George did not appear.

Critical reception
Fred Thomas of AllMusic gave the album 4.5 stars out of 5, saying, "[Del has] clearly been writing his own rules since the beginning, and the lucid dreaming and everyday observations of I Wish My Brother George Was Here are the first and some of the best examples of this, and how wonderful the results can be."

Track listing

Charts

References

External links
 

1991 debut albums
Del the Funky Homosapien albums
Elektra Records albums